The Belumbury Dany is a city car a little over three metres, able to accommodate up to 4 people and is available with either an electrical or internal combustion engine. The Dany was developed in collaboration with the University of Camerino, with Woodpecker (manufacturer of racing cars niche) and Carcerano (Atelier design).

The Dany was introduced in 2011 at the Milan International Motorcycle Show. Due to its limited speed, it is categorised as a motorised quadricycle (L7e) and can be driven with a European A1 licence.

The Dany is made in Italy – Belumbury is based in Rome – and made specifically for each customer, with seat materials, body colors and stereo options all up for debate. It intends to attract affluent customers who are looking for something entirely customizable. Belumbury has sold around 100 Dany vehicles in the year since it went on sale.

Specification

Dany Termica
The petrol Dany is powered by a 505 cc Lombardini LGW 523 mpi engine, producing 15 kW.

Dany Elettrica

Concept models
The Lallo concept, designed for going-to-the-beach duty, doesn't even have doors.

References

External links

Cars of Italy
City cars
Battery electric vehicles